John S. Shellenberger (also Shallenberger, 30 August 1839 - 16 January 1911) was a corporal in the United States Army who was awarded the Presidential Medal of Honor for gallantry during the American Civil War. He was awarded the medal on 6 April 1865 for actions performed at the Battle of Deep Run in Virginia on 16 August 1864.

Personal life 
Shellenberger was born on 30 August 1839 in Fayette County, Pennsylvania. His home of record was Perryopolis, Pennsylvania. After the war, he worked as a farm laborer in Ohio. He died at the age of 71 on 16 January 1911 in Granville, Licking County, Ohio.

Military service 
Shellenberger enlisted in the Army as a corporal on 12 November 1861 at Perryopolis and was mustered into Company B of the 85th Pennsylvania Infantry. During a charge on Confederate positions in which his unit suffered heavy casualties, Shellenberger was able to capture a Confederate regimental flag and became one of the 3 soldiers in his unit to be awarded the Medal of Honor.

Shellenberger's Medal of Honor citation reads:

Notes 
In 2013, Pennsylvania's state legislature redesignated a section of the Mon Valley Expressway Interchange in Fayette County (Exit 18) the John S. Shellenberger Exchange.

References 

1839 births
1911 deaths
19th-century United States Army personnel
United States Army Medal of Honor recipients
American Civil War recipients of the Medal of Honor
People from Fayette County, Pennsylvania